Diplomatic relations exist between Armenia and Canada. Both nations are members of the Organisation internationale de la Francophonie and the United Nations.

History
Canada recognized Armenia soon after its separation from the Soviet Union in 1991. In 1992, Armenia and Canada formally established diplomatic relations.

Over the years, both nations have signed bilateral agreements, such as a Trade and Commerce Agreement (1999); Promotion and Protection of Investments Agreement (1999) and an Agreement on the  Avoidance of Double Taxation and the Prevention of Fiscal Evasion with Respect to Taxes on Income and on Capital (1999).

In 2006 Canada officially recognized the Armenian genocide. In October 2018, Canadian Prime Minister Justin Trudeau paid a visit to Armenia to attend the 17th Summit of the Organisation internationale de la Francophonie. During the visit, Prime Minister Trudeau met with Armenian President Armen Sarkissian and Prime Minister Nikol Pashinyan; to further strengthen the relations between both nations.

Trade
In 2017, total trade between both nations totaled US$35.7 million. Armenia's main exports include: precious metals and stones and textile products. Canada's main exports include: food products, machinery and equipment, and chemical products.

Resident diplomatic missions
 Armenia has an embassy in Ottawa.
 Canada is accredited to Armenia from its embassy in Moscow, Russia and maintains an honorary consulate in Yerevan.

See also 

 Foreign relations of Armenia
 Foreign relations of Canada
 Armenian Canadians
 Ararat (film)
 Armenian genocide recognition

References

 
Canada
Bilateral relations of Canada